Waiting for Love is a 1981 Soviet romantic comedy film directed by Pyotr Todorovsky starring Ludmila Gurchenko and Sergei Shakurov. The film is set in the Ukrainian city of Odessa.

Cast
Lyudmila Gurchenko as Margarita   Solovyova, Rita
Sergey Shakurov as Lev Gavrilov, Rita's groom
Svetlana Ponomareva as Tanya, Rita's daughter
Natalya Nazarova  as Lusya, hairdresser, Rita's friend
Yevgeniy Yevstigneyev as   Rita's uncle
Stanislav Sokolov as Viktor, lawyer, Lusya's husband  
Vsevolod Shilovsky as Pasha, photographer
Anatoly Vasilyev as Slava, physician for the recruitment commission
Mikhail Svetin as Vitya, musician, theater worker
Alexander Goloborodko as watcher
Lyudmila Arinina as waitress
Vadim Alexandrov as client of the studio
Vasily Vekshin as passer-by
Pavel Vinnik  as episode
Inna Vykhodtsev  as mother with milk
David Giorgobiani as Rezo
Lily Yevstigneyeva as woman with underwear
Lia Kapanadze as Rezo's mother   
Olesya Malakhova as episode 
Ivan Matveev as grandfather with a horse
Andrey Nikolaev as  groom-morjachok
Mikhail Rozanov as  groom
Galina Samokhina as visitor lawyer
Elena Sotnikova as bride
Galina Starikova as episode 
Shota Skhirtladze as Georgian-driver
Zurab Tsintskiladze as episode

References

External links
 

1981 romantic comedy films
1981 films
Soviet romantic comedy films
Russian romantic comedy films
1980s Russian-language films
Films directed by Pyotr Todorovsky
Mosfilm films